Lucas Omar Rodriguez Pagano (born April 22, 1980) is an Argentine football player. He started his career with Brazilian football club Sport Club Corinthians Paulista but also played for Cypriot club Olympiakos Nicosia.

External links 
 Lucas Omar Rodríguez Pagano at BDFA.com.ar 

1980 births
Living people
Footballers from Buenos Aires
Argentine footballers
Chacarita Juniors footballers
Independiente Rivadavia footballers
Club Libertad footballers
Unión de Santa Fe footballers
Ferro Carril Oeste footballers
Deportivo Morón footballers
Olympiakos Nicosia players
SC Fortuna Köln players
Olimpo footballers
Cypriot First Division players
Argentine expatriate footballers
Expatriate footballers in Brazil
Expatriate footballers in Cyprus
Expatriate footballers in Germany
Expatriate footballers in Paraguay
Association football defenders